Sreeja Das is an Indian actress who appears in Malayalam cinema. Sreeja debuted her acting career in 2016 as Mariya Joseph in the movie Action Hero Biju  directed by Abrid Shine. Her breakthrough came in 2017 when she played the role of Appani Ravi's wife in Angamaly Diaries  directed by Lijo Jose Pellissery. She played the female lead role for the first time in the Karinkkannan directed by Pappan Narippatta, which was released in 2018.

Filmography

References

External links 
 

Year of birth missing (living people)
Living people
Actresses in Malayalam cinema